James Wanklyn may refer to:

 James Alfred Wanklyn (1834–1906), English analytical chemist
 James Leslie Wanklyn (1860–1919), British politician